Daniel Thomas O'Connor (born March 30, 1985) is an American professional boxer. As of June 14, 2010, O'Connor fought for the boxing promotion Murphys Boxing, which was founded by Ken Casey of the Boston punk band, Dropkick Murphys.

Early life
An Irish American, O'Connor started playing soccer at the age of five and continued throughout high school. He remains an avid soccer fan and is a supporter of Celtic F.C., Liverpool F.C., his home town team the, New England Revolution, and is a member of American Outlaws US Soccer Supporters.

After meeting O'Connor and learning of his loyal support, the New England Revolutions made O'Connor an honorary captain for the 6/2/12 Revs versus Chicago Fire game.

Along with a passion for soccer, Danny developed a love of boxing while growing up by spending every Friday evening in front of the TV set with his grandfather watching Friday Night Fights. This introduced him to boxing at a young age. O' Connor decided to start boxing at 16 years old at the Framingham Police Athletic League in Framingham, Massachusetts.

As a child growing up without cable television, Dannys' mother taught him how to sew. This skill he honed and later used in his early boxing career. O'Connor, "I make all my own outfits. When I was a kid, I didn't have cable and there wasn't much to do, so my mother taught me how to sew. I make all my outfits from scratch. I go to the fabric store and sew them up myself."

Amateur career

O'Connor was the 2007 US Olympic Trials bronze medalist and the 2008 U.S. Olympic Team alternate. He ended his amateur career with a record of 110 wins and 11 losses. O'Connor, a four-time New England Golden Gloves champion, won the 2008 national Golden Gloves at light welterweight. O'Connor also won the US Nationals in 2008 and was voted outstanding boxer of the tournament. Winning these two national tournaments in the same year back to back put O'Connor in an elite list of boxers who have accomplished this which includes Sugar Ray Leonard and Thomas Hearns. Danny's most notable victory as an amateur was a dominant 23-3 win against eventual 2008 Olympic Gold medalist Manuel Félix Díaz. O'Connor was featured in the May 5, 2008, issue of Sports Illustrated faces in the crowd for his boxing skills.

Danny O'Connors amateur career accomplishments has helped take him to places such as Russia and China to compete in tournaments however Danny credits his "New England upbringing as the explanation for his success. There is no special formula. Old fashion hard work, desire, and dedication are how results are rendered."

Professional career
Upon returning from the Beijing Olympics, O'Connor turned pro on September 17, 2008. Danny signed under Warriors Boxing and Dibella entertainment.

O'Connor was managed by Ken Casey of the Dropkick Murphys. O'Connor and Casey met through Casey's charity The Claddagh fund. Danny and Ken struck up a friendship and decided they both had the same goals, to bring the sport of Boxing back to the city of Boston and New England.  Together O'Connor and Casey are creating events that include sports and rock-n-roll. O'Connor explains, "The boxing business is a tough business, but at the end of the day, it's the entertainment business. Together with the Dropkicks, I think we can create something special in Boston and beyond. I'm so excited for the future"

O'Connors' training camp was based in Houston. His former boxing coach is Hall of Fame trainer Ronnie Shields. After Shields retired from boxing, he became a prominent trainer in the sport. O'Connor speaks of his trainer during an interview, "Coach Ronnie gave me my life back," he says. "He is truly a teacher and being taught by him is an honor for me."  O'Connor trains at a facility called "Plex" which is a conditioning gym that houses all kinds of professional athletes run by Danny Arnold. Danny Arnold is also O'Connors' strength and conditioning coach.

O'Connor has boxed 104 rounds with a knock out percentage of 33.33% in his professional career.

History in the making
 

In May 2012 O'Connor headlined the first ever professional boxing card at the Boston House of Blues directly across from Fenway Park. It was his first home town fight in three years. The Old Brigade open for the Dropkick Murphys, who played few songs before O'Connor took the ring. Ken Casey of the Dropkick Murphys returned to the ring as one of Dannys' corner men for the fight.

O'Connor followed up that win by headlining the first-ever boxing card at Gillette Stadium on August 12, 2012.  The New England Revolution played on the field first then all eyes were on the boxing ring set up inside the stadium. O'Connor is quoted, "There is no better feeling that fighting at home in front of family and friends. And for this fight I also have the support of The New England Revolution and its great fans. My goal is to bring the passion of soccer fans to boxing. A year ago nobody knew who I was and on Sunday night I'm fighting at Gillette Stadium." O'Connor won that fight with a fourth-round technical knockout.

On January 26, 2013, O'Connor headlined "Night at the Fights". It was originally scheduled for December 14, 2012, but postponed due to a sparring injury. It was the first fight held at TD Garden since 2007 and more than 4,500 fans packed the stands.

The light welterweight O'Connor came up a weight class for this fight and beat the undefeated New England welterweight champ in a hard-fought bout that lasted 10 rounds. (the championship belt and title was not on the line for this fight because any defense would have to be fought at 147 pounds). O'Connor won by majority decision.

After the fight, O'Connor is quoted as saying, ""It's amazing, I wanted to tear up when I was walking out. It's a moment that I've dreamed of for so long. For it to actually happen and to really feel what it's like, it's indescribable It's a dream come true. If I never pick up a pair of gloves for the rest of my life, I can always come back and say, 'I fought in the Boston Garden. I was the main event and I won.' The old Boston Garden has an impressive boxing history behind it and it was specifically designed for boxing.

Former world champions Marlon Starling, Vinny Pazienza and Mickey Ward were all in attendance. In O'Connor's corner was hockey great Shawn Thornton working the spit bucket for the first two rounds and undefeated boxer Edwin Rodriguez.

Boston Strong
On June 29, 2013, O'Connor beat Hector Munoz by unanimous decision in an eight-round bout fought at Foxwoods Casino in Connecticut. All three judges scored the fight 79-73 in O'Connor's favor.  

During this fight O'Connor put aside his normal Clan O'Connor boxing outfit and wore a custom-made outfit honoring the Boston Marathon bombing victims. "For this one, I'm putting the Clan O'Connor gear aside and doing something for the city. I sat down with Rival Boxing, who makes all my gear, and I hit it home about what I wanted to represent with this." O'Connor is quoted as saying, "The uniform included a jacket, shoes and trunks. It sports the Boston Marathon colors with the names of all the victims stitched into it, 'Boston Strong' and Boston sports patches." "Being from Boston, I was directly affected by the bombings — the whole community was," O'Connor said. "I was on [the Internet], sitting on my sofa for hours following the whole thing on the police scanner. I know so many people who could have been down there, it could have been anyone. I was trying to remember who told me they were going down to the finish line."

After the fight, O'Connor will be auctioning off the custom-made boxing outfit to the highest bidder with all proceeds going to the One Fund, a charity set up for the victims. O'Connor is quoted as saying, "This means a lot to me. It's not like I'm on a team playing 100 games, so, after this one fight, we're going to auction everything with all proceeds going to The One Fund. It's just my way of showing my appreciation for what these families have been through. ... Boston is tight-knit and this affected me and all Bostonians a lot. We're Boston Strong!"

Danny O returned to the ring at Plymouth Memorial Hall in Plymouth, Ma with the Monster Brawl on Thursday October 30, 2014. Danny improved to 24-2 (8ko's) with a fourth round stoppage of Virginia's Andrew Farmer. Farmer looked relaxed and confident entering the ring, despite the strong O'Connor crowd led by bagpipes and drums, but O'Connor's southpaw style, sharp accurate jab, and thumping body shots had Farmer perplexed from the first round on. A right hook counter opened a stubborn cut over Farmer's left eye in the third round, and the continued pressure by O'Connor kept it open throughout the fight. A sharp uppercut to the body put Farmer down to one knee in the fourth, where he remained for the count.

O'Connor originally had been slated to fight in the featured bout at Agganis Arena before giving up that spot on the NBC's Premier Boxing Champions show to take on Paulie Malignaggi, at Brooklyn Barclays Center on the Amir Khan vs. Chris Algieri undercard. But in mid-May, Malignaggi sustained a cut over his left eyelid while sparring, forcing him to pull out of the fight last minute. O'Connor had trained to face one kind of boxer but now would fight another, Chris Gilbert at Agganis Arena. The welterweight from Framingham picked up his third straight stoppage victory, knocking down Gilbert five times before referee Leo Gerstel stopped the fight in the fifth round at Boston University Agganis Arena to capture the vacant New England welterweight title. At the time of the stoppage, O'Connor led on all three judges' scorecards, 40-34.

During his boxing career, O'Connor started 'Off the Canvas', a nonprofit organization to help at-risk youth.

O'Connor regained the New England title with an eight-round majority decision over reigning champion Michael McLaughlin at the House of Blues in Boston. Winning also gave O'Connor the Celtic Nations title from McLaughlin.
After Impressive Wins over Steve Clagget ( UD) And Daniel Gongleze (KO) Danny's Manager John Means sent him again to a camp in Colorado to train for what would Be his WBC world title shot in Fresno Ca against world champion Jose Ramirez. Right before Weigh-in for that bout, Danny fell ill and the fight was scrapped. As of 2022 Danny was Retired from the sport and is a Firefighter in Colorado. In 2023 Danny had been training and in fight shape and after a 5 year lay off he is set to Appear on UFC Fight pass and 3-D promotions card on March 16, 2023 . Billed as a comeback.

Professional boxing record

| style="text-align:center;" colspan="8"|30 Wins (11 KOs), 3 Losses
|-  style="text-align:center; background:#e3e3e3;"
|  style="border-style:none none solid solid; "|Res.
|  style="border-style:none none solid solid; "|Record
|  style="border-style:none none solid solid; "|Opponent
|  style="border-style:none none solid solid; "|Type
|  style="border-style:none none solid solid; "|Round
|  style="border-style:none none solid solid; "|Date
|  style="border-style:none none solid solid; "|Location
|  style="border-style:none none solid solid; "|Notes
|- align=center
|Win
|30-3
|align=left| Steve Claggett
|
|
|
|align=left| House of Blues, Boston
|align=left|
|- align=center
|Win
|29-3
|align=left| Daniel Gonzalez
|
|
|
|align=left| Mohegan Sun Casino, Uncasville
|align=left|
|- align=center
|Win
|28-3
|align=left| Michael McLaughlin
|
|
|
|align=left| House of Blues, Boston, Massachusetts
|align=left|
|- align=center
|Win
|27-3
|align=left| Jerry Thomas
|
|
|
|align=left| Kansas Expocentre, Topeka, Kanas
|align=left|
|- align=center
|Loss
|26-3
|align=left| Gabriel Bracero
|
|
|
|align=left| Lowell Memorial Auditorium, Lowell, Massachusetts
|
|- align=center
|Win
|26-2
|align=left| Chris Gilbert
|
|
|
|align=left| Agganis Arena, Boston, Massachusetts
|
|- align=center
|Win
|25-2
|align=left| Michael Clark
|
|
|
|align=left| 	Memorial Hall, Melrose, Massachusetts 
|
|- align=center
|Win
|24-2
|align=left| Andrew Farmer
|
|
|
|align=left| 	Memorial Hall, Plymouth, Massachusetts 
|
|- align=center
|Loss
|23-2
|align=left| Vivian Harris
|
|
|
|align=left| The Electric Factory, Philadelphia, Pennsylvania
|
|- align=center
|Win
|23-1
|align=left|Raul Tovar
|
|
|
|align=left|Verizon Wireless Arena, Manchester, New Hampshire
|
|- align=center
|Win
|22-1
|align=left|Ruben Galvan
|
|
|
|align=left|SportsZone, Derry, New Hampshire
|
|- align=center
|Win
|21-1
|align=left| Hector Munoz
|
|
|
|align=left|MGM Grand at Foxwoods Resort, Mashantucket, Connecticut
|
|- align=center
|Win
|20-1
|align=left| Derek Silveria
|
|
|
|align=left| TD Garden, Boston, Massachusetts
|
|- align=center
|Win
|19-1
|align=left| Josh Sosa
|
|
|
|align=left| MGM Grand at Foxwoods Resort, Mashantucket, Connecticut
|
|- align=center
|Win
|18-1
|align=left| Eddie Soto
|
|
|
|align=left|
|
|- align=center
|Win
|17-1
|align=left| Daniel Sostre
|
|
|
|align=left|
|
|- align=center
|Win
|16-1
|align=left| Bryan Abraham
|
|
|
|align=left| Foxwoods Resort, Mashantucket, Connecticut
|
|- align=center
|Win
|15-1
|align=left| Jaime Del Cid
|
|
|
|align=left|
|
|- align=center
|Loss
|14-1
|align=left| Gabriel Bracero
|
|
|
|align=left|
|align=left|
|- align=center
|Win
|14-0
|align=left| Humberto Tapia
|
|
|
|align=left|
|
|- align=center
|Win
|13-0
|align=left| Jose Angel Roman
|
|
|
|align=left|
|
|- align=center
|Win
|12-0
|align=left| Broderick Antoine
|
|
|
|align=left|
|
|- align=center
|Win
|11-0
|align=left| Franklin Gonzales
|
|
|
|align=left|
|
|- align=center
|Win
|10-0
|align=left| James Hope
|
|
|
|align=left|
|
|- align=center
|Win
|9-0
|align=left| Patrick Cape
|
|
|
|align=left|
|
|- align=center
|Win
|8-0
|align=left| James Helmes
|
|
|
|align=left|
|
|- align=center
|Win
|7-0
|align=left| Sebastian Hamel
|
|
|
|align=left|
|
|- align=center
|Win
|6-0
|align=left| Travis Hartman
|
|
|
|align=left|
|
|- align=center
|Win
|5-0
|align=left| Charles Wade
|
|
|
|align=left|
|
|- align=center
|Win
|4-0
|align=left| Jamar Saunders
|
|
|
|align=left|
|
|- align=center
|Win
|3-0
|align=left| Gregorio Jimenez
|
|
|
|align=left|
|
|- align=center
|Win
|2-0
|align=left| Anthony Woods
|
|
|
|align=left|
|
|- align=center
|Win
|1-0
|align=left| Jose Guerrido
|
|
|
|align=left|
|align=left|

Twitter Account

O'Connor refers to his own boxing fans and loyal supporters as "Clan O'Connor" and the "fanfamily". His supporters started a fan base for him on Twitter by the name @ClanOConnor12. Danny stays active with his supporters on Twitter as well, by the name @DOC_Boxing. He encourages and welcomes communication with his fan base on a daily basis.

References

External links

1985 births
Living people
American people of Irish descent
American male boxers
Sportspeople from Framingham, Massachusetts
Boxers from Massachusetts
Light-welterweight boxers